Juan Alejandro Barreto Cipriani (born 1959) is a politician in Venezuela. He was mayor of Caracas from 2004 until 2008. Juan Barreto belongs to the REDES party.

Career

Congressperson
Juan Barreto entered the political scene with his election to the Venezuelan Chamber of Deputies in the November 1998 elections.  On July 30, 2000, Barreto was elected to the newly created National Assembly (the legislative body that replaced the Chamber of Deputies), receiving 276,952 votes, or 53.98% of the total votes, and represented the Venezuelan Capital District.  He resigned from this position when he was elected mayor of Caracas in October 2004.

Mayor of Caracas
During his term in office, Barreto's relationships with the other mayors of Caracas were hostile. On August 22, 2006 he denounced fellow mayors Leopoldo López and Henrique Capriles. In response, both announced legal action against him.

Other
Juan Barreto has received degrees in journalism and social sciences.  He was the director of the newspaper "Correo del Presidente", the Oficina Central de Información (OCI, now the Ministry of Communication and Information), and the news agency Venpres (now known as the Agencia Bolivariana de Noticias, or ABN).  Barreto is also a professor at the Universidad Central de Venezuela.

He was longlisted for the 2008 World Mayor award.

See also
Leopoldo López
Henrique Capriles

References

External links
CityMayors profile
Venezuela to seize golf courses, BBC, 30 August 2006
VHeadline
"Si tenemos que expropiar un municipio completo, lo haremos", El Universal, 23 August 2006

1959 births
Living people
Members of the Venezuelan Chamber of Deputies
United Socialist Party of Venezuela politicians
Members of the National Assembly (Venezuela)
Mayors of places in Venezuela